This is a list of schools in the Australian Capital Territory, which houses Australia's capital city, Canberra. The Territory's education system consists of primary schools, which accommodate students from Kindergarten to Year 6, high schools, which accommodate students from Years 7 to 10, and secondary colleges, which are specialist Year 11–12 institutions. As a result of development in newer areas and mergers in existing areas, some schools accommodate more than one of the above year ranges. Certificates are awarded on the basis of continuous assessment of students' progress at the end of years 10 and 12 by the ACT Education Directorate.

Public schools

Primary schools (K–12)

Includes Early Childhood Schools (K–2) and K–10 schools

High schools (7–10)

Secondary colleges (11–12)

Other schools, including Play Schools

Closed public schools

Private and Independent schools

Primary schools

High and K–12 schools

Closed private schools

Notes

References
 Consolidated Spreadsheet of ACT Schools
 Directory of Schools, a directory of government and approved non-government schools in the Australian Capital Territory. (ACT Education Directorate)
 Schools in the ACT (ACT Libraries)
 Associated Southern Colleges

Australian Capital Territory
Schools
 
 
 
 
 
Schools